Aleksei Aleksandrovich Balandin (December 20 n.s., 1898 – May 22, 1967) was a Soviet chemist member of the Academy of Sciences of the Soviet Union. His primary contribution lies in the field of organic catalysis, where is known as the developed of the multiplet theory of catalysis. He is the author of several books, and many scientific papers.

The lunar crater Balandin was named in his honor.

Publications

Books
Khlopin, V. G., Balandin, A. A., Pogodin, S. A., & Volʹfkovich, S. I. (1945). Ocherki po istorii Akademii nauk: khimicheskie nauki. Moskva: Izd-vo Akademii nauk SSSR. 
Balandin, A. A. (1964). Catalysis and chemical kinetics, by A. A. Balandin [and others]. New York: Academic Press.
Vsesoi︠u︡znoe soveshchanie po nauchnym osnovam podbora katalizatorov geterogennykh kataliticheskikh reakt︠s︡iĭ, & Balandin, A. A. (1968). Translated as: Scientific selection of catalysts. Problems of kinetics and catalysis, 11. Jerusalem: Israel Program for Scientific Translations. 
Balandin, A. A. (1964). Catalysis and chemical kinetics. New York: Academic Press. 
Balandin, A. A., & Klabunovskiĭ, E. I. (1972). Izbrannye trudy. Moskva: "Nauka,".

Biographical references
 Klabunovskiĭ, E. I., & Logunov, A. A. (1984). Alekseĭ Aleksandrovich Balandin. Materially k biobibliografii uchenykh SSSR., vyp. 71. Moskva: Izdvo Akademii nauk SSSR.
Nesterova, N. M. (1958). Alekseĭ Aleksandrovich Balandin. Materially k biobibliografii uchenykh SSSR., vyp. 28. Moskva: Izd-vo Akademii nauk SSSR.
Poli︠a︡kova, N. B., & Klabunovskiĭ, E. I. (1984). Alekseĭ Aleksandrovic̊ Balandin, 1898-1967. Moskva: "Nauka".
Klabunovskiĭ, E. I., Solovʹev, I. I., & Gri︠a︡znov, V. M. (1998). Alekseĭ Aleksandrovich Balandin, 1898-1967. Moskva: "Nauka".

References

1898 births
1967 deaths
20th-century chemists
Full Members of the USSR Academy of Sciences
Stalin Prize winners
Recipients of the Order of Lenin
Recipients of the Order of the Red Banner of Labour
Russian chemists
Soviet chemists
Burials at Novodevichy Cemetery
Norillag detainees